Abdalanlı (also, Abdalanly and Abdalinlu) is a village in the Qubadli Rayon of Azerbaijan.
Abdalani is the Azeri village in Qubadli.

References

External links
Satellite map at Maplandia.com

Populated places in Qubadli District